Nightrage is a Greek/Swedish melodic death metal band originally from Thessaloniki. They later re-located to Gothenburg, Sweden.

History

Formation and Sweet Vengeance (2000–2003) 
Nightrage was founded by Marios Iliopoulos and his close friend Gus G in June 2000. They made three demos from 2001 to 2002.

Their debut album, Sweet Vengeance, was released in 2003 and featured drummer Per Möller Jensen (The Haunted), and bassist Brice Leclercq. They also managed to acquire the services of legendary vocalist Tomas Lindberg (ex At the Gates). Sweet Vengeance also featured guest clean vocals on a few tracks by Tom S. Englund of Evergrey fame. The album is proceeded by their first video for the track "Gloomy Daydreams" on an earlier edit, with Gus G. on vocals.

Descent into Chaos and departure of Lindberg & Gus G (2004–2006) 
Their second release, Descent into Chaos, was released in 2005 and had a change of line up, with the addition of a more permanent rhythm section. Fotis Benardo (Septic Flesh, ex-Innerwish) took over on drums and Henric Carlsson, who also plays in the band Cipher System, on bass. Mikael Stanne, of Dark Tranquillity, provided a clean vocal section on the track "Frozen." Tomas Lindberg left the band so that a more full-time vocalist could accompany them on tours and studio albums.

When Gus G was performing with Arch Enemy at Ozzfest 2005, he was replaced by Pierre Lysell for Nightrage's touring activities. For some of Nightrage's tour in support of Bolt Thrower, Gus G was again unavailable and his place was taken by Christian Muenzer, of Necrophagist. In March 2006, Gus G. permanently left Nightrage to focus completely on Firewind (later in 2009 becoming the guitarist for Ozzy Osbourne). At this time, Fotis Benardo decided also to leave Nightrage and focus on the reunited Septic Flesh. He was replaced by Alex Svenningson.

A New Disease Is Born (2007–2008) 
Their third release, A New Disease Is Born, was released in 2007. Gus G. was replaced by Dragonland/Amaranthe guitar virtuoso Olof Mörck. The song "Scathing" was chosen for the band's second video, and was directed by Bob Katsionis.

After the release of A New Disease Is Born, Alex Svenningson and Jimmie Strimell left the band to form the melodic metalcore band Dead by April. Longtime bassist Henric Karlsson also left the band due to his family obligations.

Wearing a Martyr's Crown and Vengeance Descending (2009–2010) 
Vocalist Antony Hämäläinen, bassist Anders Hammer, and drummer Johan Nunez joined the band in the summer of 2007. Their fourth album, Wearing a Martyr's Crown, was recorded, produced, and mixed by Fredrik Nordström at Studio Fredman for a 2009 release date.

On 18 February 2010, Nightrage released their third music video for the song "Wearing a Martyr's Crown." The video was again directed by Bob Katsionis.

"A Grim Struggle", "Collision of Fate", "Shed the Blood", and "Wearing a Martyr's Crown"  were made available as downloadable content for the Rock Band video game series on Xbox. On 30 June 2011, "A Grim Struggle" was made available for download on the PlayStation 3 console.

Vengeance Descending is a double CD reissue of albums Sweet Vengeance and Descent into Chaos. The first disc features a bonus track called "Gloomy Daydreams", and the second one features "Black Skies", which was also a bonus track. Both tracks were previously only available in Japanese releases.

Insidious and World Tour (2011–2012) 
It was announced via Blabbermouth.net that former At the Gates and Nightrage vocalist Tomas Lindberg will be performing guest vocals for the new album entitled Insidious. A short video clip of the session was added to YouTube. Other guests set to appear on the new album are Gus G, Tom Englund, Apollo Papathanasio and John K. Insidious was the first album since Sweet Vengeance to feature the original line up.

Antony Hämäläinen spoke briefly about the album's direction in a recent interview with Deathmetalbaboon.com "It sounds really heavy. Stripped down and in your face. The songs are a bit shorter and with fewer acoustic guitars than Wearing a Martyr's Crown. It's a very pissed off sound, so it's going to be a really heavy record. Lots of guitar solos and melodies there too of course."
The album release dates were 26 September 2011 in Europe and 11 October 2011 in North America.

On 23 March the title track "Insidious" was made available as downloadable content for the Rock Band video game series on Xbox.

On 21 May the band released a new video for the track Delirium of the Fallen. The video was shot on 28 April at the Eightball Club in Thessaloniki, Greece. Directing of the clip was handled by Gabriel Psaltakis.

Starting on 9 October 2011, the band supported the new album on a tour of North America with Firewind and Arsis, titled "Frets of Fury".

In late April 2012, a tour of Europe alongside Demon Hunter and Deadlock was scheduled.

August 2012 was the first time the band played in Asia, headlining the Daejeon Metal Festival in South Korea.

Announced in April 2013, the band will headline a tour of Japan for the first time in their career. The tour is set to start on 5 November and will be titled "Extreme metal over Japan". Support for the six date trek will come from the Australian technical death metal band Psycroptic, American technical death band The Faceless and French deathcore act In Arkadia.

Olof Mörck has not been part of a live performance or band photography since 2011. It is assumed he has left the band to focus on his main project Amaranthe.

New members and releases (2013–present) 
In 2013, Antony Hämäläinen officially left the band to pursue other musical ventures. Ronnie Nyman was recruited to replace Hämäläinen on vocals. With Nyman, the band released their sixth studio album, The Puritan, in 2015.

In July 2016, Magnus Söderman (guitars), Francisco Escalona (bass), and Lawrence Dinamarca (drums) were announced as the newest members of Nightrage. The band recorded and released their seventh studio album, The Venomous, in 2017. Their next album, Wolf to Man, was released on 29 March 2019. Their ninth studio album, Abyss Rising, was released on 22 February, 2022.

Band members 

Current line-up
 Marios Iliopoulos – clean vocals, bass (2000–2003), guitar (2000–present)
 Ronnie Nyman – vocals (2013–present)
 Francisco Escalona – bass guitar (2016–present)
 Magnus Söderman – guitars (2016–present)
 Dino George Stamoglou – drums (2018–present)

Previous members
 Gus G – vocals, drum machine (2000–2003), guitar (2000–2006)
 Brice LeClercq – bass guitar (2003–2004)
 Tomas Lindberg – vocals (2003–2005)
 Fotis Benardo – drums (2004–2006)
 Henric Karlsson – bass guitar (2004–2007)
 Jimmie Strimell – vocals (2005–2007)
 Alex Svenningson – drums (2006–2007)
 Olof Mörck – guitar (2006–2011)
 Antony Hämäläinen – vocals (2007–2013)
 Anders Hammer – bass guitar (2007–2016)
 Johan Nunez – drums (2007–2016)
 Lawrence Dinamarca – drums (2016–2018)

Session musicians
 Per Möller Jensen – session drums (2003)
 Chris Barkensjö – session drums (2014–present)

Touring musicians
 Nicholas Barker – drums (2004)
 Pierre Lysell – guitar (2006)
 Christian Münzner – guitar (2006)
 Esben Elnegaard Kjær Hansen – vocals (2007)
 Johnny Haven – vocals (2007)
 Constantine – guitar (2007)
 Morten Løwe Sørensen – drums (2007)
 Bill Hudson – guitar (2012)
 Christopher Jon – guitar (2012)
 Conny Pettersson – drums (2012)
 Jesper Strömblad – guitar (2013–2014)
 Marcus Rosell – drums (2013)

Guest musicians
 Fredrik Nordström – keyboards (on Sweet Vengeance, Descent into Chaos, Wearing A Martyr's Crown)
 Tom S. Englund – clean vocals (on Sweet Vengeance, Insidious)
 Mikael Stanne – clean vocals (on Descent into Chaos)
 Jacob Hansen – guitar solo (on A New Disease Is Born)
 Gus G – guitar solo (on Wearing A Martyr's Crown, Insidious)
 Sakis Tolis – backing vocals (on Wearing A Martyr's Crown)
 Elias Holmlid – keyboards (on Wearing A Martyr's Crown, Insidious)
 Tomas Lindberg – guest vocals (on Insidious)
 Apollo Papathanasio – clean vocals (on Insidious)
 John K – orchestrations and keyboards (on Insidious)
 George Baharidis – orchestrations (on Insidious)

Timeline

Discography

Demo albums 
 Demo (2000)
 Demo 2 (2001, 2020 (as an official compilation))
 Demo 3 (2002)

Studio albums 
 Sweet Vengeance (2003)
 Descent into Chaos (2005)
 A New Disease Is Born (2007)
 Wearing a Martyr's Crown (2009)
 Insidious (2011)
 The Puritan (2015)
 The Venomous (2017)
 Wolf to Man (2019)
 Abyss Rising (2022)

Compilation albums 
 Vengeance Descending (2010)

References

External links
 
 Official Facebook
 Nightrage at Encyclopaedia Metallum
 Nightrage at YouTube
 Nightrage at SoundCloud
 Nightrage at Google+
 Nightrage at Twitter
 Nightrage at Spotify
 Nightrage at Last.fm
 Interview with Deathmetalbaboon.com

Greek melodic death metal musical groups
Musical groups established in 2000
Century Media Records artists
Swedish melodic death metal musical groups
Musical groups from Thessaloniki
Musical groups from Gothenburg
Musical quintets